Troutman is a surname. Notable people with the surname include:

 Arenda Troutman (born 1957), American politician
 Beth Troutman (born 1977), American television personality
 Ivy Troutman (1884–1979), Broadway actress
 Larry Troutman (1944–1999), percussionist of Zapp
 Roger Troutman (1951–1999), lead singer of Zapp

See also
 Troutman, North Carolina
 Trautmann

English-language surnames